Christian L. Brusletten (September 9, 1853 – July 29, 1925) was an American banker, businessman,  and elected official.

Christian Larson Brusletten was born at Nes in Buskerud, Norway. He was the son of Lars A. Brusletten (1823–1904) and Ingri (Dokken)  Brusletten (1822–1900).  He moved with his family to the United States in 1858. He graduated from the Northwestern Business College in Madison, Wisconsin in 1879.  Brusletten in the banking and mercantile businesses. He served as President of the  Citizens  Bank  of Kenyon.

Brusletten entered in local government in Kenyon, Minnesota and was the local postmaster.  He served in the Minnesota House of Representatives as a Republican from 1897 to 1901. Brusletten died in Kenyon, Minnesota and was buried at the Gol Lutheran Church Cemetery.

References

1853 births
1925 deaths
People from Kenyon, Minnesota
Madison Business College alumni
Republican Party members of the Minnesota House of Representatives
Businesspeople from Minnesota
Farmers from Minnesota
American bank presidents
Minnesota postmasters
American Lutherans
Norwegian emigrants to the United States
People from Nes, Buskerud
19th-century American politicians
20th-century American politicians